Giuseppe Gemiti (born 3 May 1981) is a German former professional footballer who played as a defender.

Career

Eintracht Frankfurt and Udinese
An Eintracht Frankfurt youth product, Gemiti moved to Italy joining Udinese Calcio in 2002.

Gemiti played just four league matches with Udinese in the 2003–04 season, being injured for a month in October 2003 and out-favored by head coach Luciano Spalletti.

In July 2005, he left for Serie B side Modena in a co-ownership deal; he left for Serie A side Chievo in January 2006. In June 2006 Chievo decided not to buy him outright and Modena not to buy Riccardo Bolzan either. But Modena decided to buy Cristian Bucchi from Chievo and Tommaso Chiecchi was bought back by Chievo from Modena.

In July 2006, he left for Piacenza as part of Carlo Luisi's deal.

Novara
In January 2010, he signed a six-month deal with Novara as a free agent, after being released by Modena F.C. in summer 2009. On 8 June 2010, the club announced he signed a new three-year contract after winning the 1st Division Group A champion and promoted to Serie B.

Livorno
In summer 2012 Gemiti was swapped with Romano Perticone of A.S. Livorno Calcio. Gemiti signed a three-year contract.

Bari
On 19 June 2015, Gemiti was signed by Bari.

Cremonese
On 24 June 2016, Gemiti joined Serie C club Cremonese.

Honours
Novara
Lega Pro Prima Divisione: 2009–10

References

External links
 
 
 Giuseppe Gemiti at AIC.Football.it  
 

1981 births
Living people
German footballers
German expatriate footballers
Eintracht Frankfurt players
Eintracht Frankfurt II players
Udinese Calcio players
Genoa C.F.C. players
Modena F.C. players
A.C. ChievoVerona players
Piacenza Calcio 1919 players
Novara F.C. players
U.S. Livorno 1915 players
S.S.C. Bari players
Bundesliga players
2. Bundesliga players
Serie A players
Serie B players
German sportspeople of Italian descent
Association football midfielders
Footballers from Frankfurt
Expatriate footballers in Italy
Germany youth international footballers
Germany under-21 international footballers
Serie C players
U.S. Cremonese players